"Your Number" may refer to:
 "Your Number" (Ayo Jay song)
 "Your Number" (Shinee song)